The  is a rest area that is located on the Fukagawa Route of the Shuto Expressway in Tatsumi, Kōtō, Tokyo.

In has been in service since October 22, 1991. Located in the Tatsumi Junction, only vehicles heading from the Bayshore Route via Ariake Junction to the Fukagawa Route (Hakozaki area) can be used.

References

External links
 Tatsumi No. 2 PA - Tatsumi No. 2 PA-Metropolitan Expressway Service 

Rest areas in Japan
Road transport in Tokyo
Kōtō